"Xanadu" is a song by the Canadian progressive rock band Rush from their 1977 album A Farewell to Kings. It is approximately eleven minutes long, beginning with a five-minute-long instrumental section before transitioning to a narrative written by Neil Peart, which in turn was inspired by the Samuel Taylor Coleridge poem Kubla Khan.

Lyrics
In Peart's lyrics, the narrator describes searching for a place called "Xanadu" that will grant him immortality. After succeeding in this quest, a thousand years pass, and the narrator is left "waiting for the world to end", describing himself as "a mad immortal man".

The song is based on the poem Kubla Khan written by Samuel Taylor Coleridge. Although the song does not explicitly state where "Xanadu" is, references to Kubla Khan imply that it is a mythical place based on Shangdu, the historical summer capital of the Mongol Empire.

Music

"Xanadu" is the first Rush song in which synthesizers play an integral part. Unlike the previous albums, 2112 and Caress of Steel, "Xanadu" uses both guitar and synthesizer effects.

The song also marks Rush's clear foray into program music, although previous albums had displayed some elements of this. Subsequent albums during the late 1970s and early 1980s would see the group explore program music more systematically.

"Xanadu" requires each band member to utilize an array of instruments to affect the performance. Alex Lifeson used a double-necked Gibson electric guitar (one twelve-string, the other six-string) as well as synthesizer pedals; Geddy Lee made use of a double-necked Rickenbacker 4080/12 guitar (bass and twelve-string guitar), as well as extensive synthesizer arrangements (through both pedals and keyboards) in addition to singing; and Peart took on various percussion instruments (temple blocks, tubular bells, bell tree, glockenspiel, and wind chimes) in addition to his drum kit.

Despite its complexity and length, Xanadu is a rare "one take wonder" song.  Guitarist Alex Lifeson said, "Xanadu was well rehearsed before going to Rockfield, I remember that.  On the day we recorded it, Pat Moran, the resident engineer, set all the mics up and we ran the song down, partially to get balances and tones. Because it was a long song, we didn't need to complete that test run.

"We then played it a second time from top to bottom and that's what you hear on the album. Needless to say, Pat was shocked that we ran an 11-minute song down in one complete take. Practice doesn't always make perfect, but it sure helps!"

An abbreviated version of the song, omitting the second verse and Lee's rhythm guitar part during the ending, was performed as part of a medley during the R30 tour in 2004. However, for the R40 Live Tour in 2015, the band played the entire song with the rhythm guitar included.

Reviews
Rolling Stone magazine readers polled on the top 10 Rush songs of all time voted "Xanadu" as number six.

See also
List of songs recorded by Rush

References

Rush (band) songs
1977 songs
Songs written by Geddy Lee
Songs written by Alex Lifeson
Songs written by Neil Peart
Song recordings produced by Terry Brown (record producer)
Songs based on poems
Samuel Taylor Coleridge